The Twin Cities Jazz Fest, formerly Twin Cities Hot Summer Jazz Festival, is a jazz festival in St. Paul, Minnesota, USA. Founded in 1999 by Steve Heckler, the festival is centered in the Lowertown neighborhood in downtown St. Paul. The main stage is located in Mears Park with additional stages throughout the city. The festival closes several blocks and has used clubs such as the Bulldog, Hat Trick, St. Paul Hotel, Mancini's, Black Dog, Hygga, Vieux Carre, Union Depot, Amsterdam Bar and Gril and the Citizen Bar and Grill. In partnership with the Dakota Foundation for Jazz Education and Walker West Music Academy], over 100 young musicians perform at the festival. In addition, master classes and clinics are held at schools hosted by the festival headliners. All events are free and open to all.

Media partners have included Jazz 88 radio (broadcasting live locally and streaming live on the internet internationally), WCCO-TV, City Pages, Jazz Police, La Prenza, and MPLS-St. Paul magazine. The festival has received coverage in the Star Tribune, St. Paul Pioneer Press, Minnesota Spokesman-Recorder and Skyway News.

Festival performers have included McCoy Tyner, Joey Alexander, Dee Dee Bridgewater, Joshua Redman, The Bad Plus, Nayo Jones, Eric Alexander, Monty Alexander, Mose Allison, Dave Brubeck, Gary Burton, Joey DeFrancesco, Eumir Deodato, Bill Evans, Von Freeman, Benny Golson, Hiromi, Red Holloway, Kristin Korb, Bettye LaVette, Howard Levy, Joe Lovano, Branford Marsalis, Frank Morgan, Jack McDuff, Jimmy McGriff, David "Fathead" Newman, Tiger Okoshi, Danilo Pérez, Bernard Purdie, Phil Hey Quartet, Dewey Redman, Return to Forever, Melvin Rhyne, Bobby Sanabria, Esperanza Spalding, Spyro Gyra, Percy Strother, Ira Sullivan, Lew Tabackin, Clark Terry, Butch Thompson, Jon Weber, Jerry Weldon and the Yellowjackets.

No Jazz Fest was held in 2020.

References

External links
 Official website

Culture of Saint Paul, Minnesota
Music festivals in Minnesota
Jazz festivals in the United States
Summer festivals
Tourist attractions in Saint Paul, Minnesota